The Half-Light Symphony is the first EP by New Zealand progressive rock band Battle Circus . A concept record depicting mankind's transitional stages of existence following a cataclysmic nuclear disaster, the EP is divided into four distinct movements that provide a narrative for each part of the story. The research and hypotheses of US-based academic Dr. Philip K. Mossman heavily influenced the band, and were central to the themes of the album. 
A recording of Dr. Mossman reciting a passage from his paper entitled "Epoch" was sent to the band by the now-deceased professor's wife, and was included in the final track "Mossman's Epoch". Throughout the New Zealand tour for the album the band would perform The Half-Light Symphony in its entirety, from start to finish.

The band commissioned renowned Japanese artist Ryohei Hase (www.ryoheihase.com) to create the artwork.

Track listing

Personnel
Battle Circus
Marcel Bellve – Vocals, Guitar
Yvonne Wu – Piano
Ryan Marshall – Bass
James Whitlock – Drums, Percussion, Violin, Timpani

Additional Personnel
David Holmes – Production, Mixing, Mastering
Chris Winchcombe – Mastering
Miriam Robinson – French Horn
Lloyd de Beer – Violin
Warwick Robinson – Viola
Steve Litherland – Cello
Dr. Philip Mossman - Sample on Track 4

2007 EPs
Battle Circus (band) albums